Daring Club Motema Pembe, or simply DCMP for a short, is a Congolese football club based in Kinshasa.

History
Created in 1936 under the name Falcon Daring, by the Rev. Father Raphaël de la Kethulle de Ryhove who was a missionary of the Congregation of Scheutistes. He recruited most of its players among college students Sainte-Anne in Kinshasa (currently Elikya college). The DCMP was renamed CS Imana in 1949 before assuming the name of Daring Club Motema Pembe Imana (Imana DCMP) in 1985. With 27 titles at national level since 1963, the DCMP is currently the most successful national club of the DRC. TP Mazembe has more trophies if you include international titles won with 35. 

Notable former players include political figures Holden Roberto and Cyrille Adoula.

Crest

Honours

National Titles
Linafoot: 12
 1963, 1964, 1974, 1978, 1989, 1994, 1996, 1998, 1999, 2004, 2005, 2008

Congo Cup: 14
 1964, 1974, 1978, 1984, 1985, 1990, 1991, 1993, 1994, 2003, 2006, 2009, 2010, 2021 (Record)

DR Congo Super Cup: 2
 2003, 2005

African Titles
African Cup Winners' Cup: 1
Champion: 1994

Current squad
As of March 2015.

References

External links
 Official website

Football clubs in the Democratic Republic of the Congo
Football clubs in Kinshasa
Association football clubs established in 1936
1936 establishments in the Belgian Congo
Sports clubs in the Democratic Republic of the Congo
African Cup Winners Cup winning clubs